Steve Alaimo Sings and Swings is Steve Alaimo's seventh album and third for the ABC-Paramount label.

Track listing

Side 1
 "Cast Your Fate to the Wind"
 "Lady of the House"
 "Love Is a Many Splendored Thing"
 "Let Her Go"
 "Need You"
 "Real Live Girl"

Side 2
 "Mais Oui"
 "Fade Out - Fade In"
 "Truer Than True"
 "Bright Lights"
 "Once a Day"
 "Love's Gonna Live Here"

1966 albums
Steve Alaimo albums
ABC Records albums